"Here Comes That Rainy Day Feeling Again" is the title of a pop song composed by Tony Macaulay, Roger Cook, and Roger Greenaway; it became the third U.S. Top 40 hit for The Fortunes in 1971, and their fifth in Canada.

Background
The song uses depressing images to describe the singer's mood anticipating a breakup with his significant other, comparable to the feeling of a rainy day or a Monday, contrasted with the "memories of Sunday" when the two were still together, as he hopes she changes her mind and comes back to him. The bridge is noted for its lines: "Misty morning eyes/ I'm trying to disguise the way I feel/ But, I just can't hide it/ People seem to know/ The loneliness will show/ I'm thinking of my pride/ But, breaking up inside, girl." Lead singer Rod Allen uses a vocal technique similar to that used by Frankie Valli on his solo records.

The song reached number 15 on the U.S. Billboard Hot 100 and number 8 on the Cash Box Top 100. It was also a hit in Canada (number 12) and charted minorly in Australia.

Chart performance

Weekly charts

Year-end charts

Cover versions
Subsequently, Sonny & Cher covered the song on their album All I Ever Need is You. 
An abbreviated cover of "Here Comes That Rainy Day Feeling Again" was included as part of the extended LP version of "Stars on 45," a number one medley hit from 1981.

References

External links
 Lyrics of this song
 

1971 singles
The Fortunes songs
Songs written by Tony Macaulay
Songs written by Roger Greenaway
Songs written by Roger Cook (songwriter)
1971 songs
Capitol Records singles